Sundridge Park, also known simply as Sundridge, is an area of Greater London within the London Borough of Bromley and prior to 1965 it was in the historic county of Kent. It is situated north of Bromley, north-west of Widmore and Bickley, south of Grove Park and south-east of Downham. In the twentieth century Sundridge names began to overlap somewhat with neighbouring   Plaistow, for example, the main Sundridge shopping parade by the station sits directly east of Plaistow Green, with business and facilities in the area using the two names interchangeably, and Plaistow Cemetery is actually on the Sundridge side of the border. However, during the early twenty first century there have been deliberate attempts to re-establish the separate identities of both villages, Sundridge has its own village sign, and representation has been made to the local council for a village sign for Plaistow. Plaistow refers especially to the area north of Sundridge Park station along Burnt Ash Lane, part of the A2212 road which runs north to south between Grove Park and Bromley.

History
Originally known as 'Sundresse', it is first mentioned in a charter of 987. In the middle ages the land was owned by the Le Blund family. In the early 1700s a large house was built on the site of Sundridge Park Manor; it was purchased and demolished by Sir Claude Scott in 1795, and the current building built in its place set in parkland.

Sundridge Park mansion
Sundridge Park Manor is a Grade I listed mansion that was designed by John Nash and built by Samuel Wyatt. It has been used as a management and conference centre but is to be split into luxury apartments, a process that was underway as of March 2020. Much of the mansion's former grounds now forms Sundridge Park Golf Club.

Transport

Rail
Sundridge Park station, opened in 1896, serves the area with National Rail services to Grove Park and to Bromley North.

Buses
 
Sundridge is served by four Transport for London bus services.
 126 to Eltham via Grove Park and to Bromley every 12 minutes
 261 to Lewisham via Grove Park and to Locksbottom via Bromley every 13 minutes
 314 to Eltham and to New Addington via Bromley every 15 minutes
 336 to Catford and to Locksbottom via Bromley every 15 minutes

Notable residents
 David Bowie - musician, lived at 4 Plaistow Grove from 1955-65.
 Peter Kropotkin - Russian anarchist, lived at 61 Crescent Road for a period.

Gallery

References

Areas of London
Districts of the London Borough of Bromley